The Pacific Music Awards are an annual New Zealand music award ceremony since 2005 that honours excellence in Pacific music in New Zealand. The awards honour musicians who primarily work in the Pacific Island style of music from the Cook Islands, Fiji, Niue, Samoa, Tonga, Tokelau or Tuvalu, and also in urban and gospel genre categories.

Organisation 
The Pacific Music Awards are run by the Pacific Music Awards Committee, which was founded in 2004 with the goal of establishing and running an annual awards for the Pacific music community in New Zealand. The inaugural event was part of the Pasifika Festival, and after that has been separate. In 2008 a charitable trust was registered called the Pacific Music Awards Trust. In 2022 the Trust's Officers were: Sina Wendt, Petrina Togi-Sa'ena, Ngaire Fuata, Pati Umaga and the Reverend Muamua Strickson - Pua. The purpose is stated as: "To create and manage an event that acknowledges the success of Pacific artists, celebrates and promotes excellence in Pacific Music and encourages young Pacific musicians to aspire to a high level of achievement."

Awards 

As of the 2014, 12 awards are given. The Best Pacific Music Album award is part of the annual Recording Industry Association of New Zealand (RIANZ) New Zealand Music Awards. Previously called the Polynesian Music Tui award, the award was renamed and the presentation was moved to the Pacific Music Awards in 2005. The Tui trophy is one of three genre awards that are presented at specialist award ceremonies, separate from the main New Zealand Music Awards ceremony, however the winner is also recognised at the main NZMA ceremony later in the year.

The Pacific Music Awards also include the Lifetime Achievement Award, which is given to an individual or group who has made a significant contribution to Pacific music, and the Phillip Fuemana Most Promising Artist Award, which honours an upcoming individual or group.

2005 Pacific Music Awards 

The 2005 awards were held on Friday 11 March 2005 as part of the annual Pasifika Festival held in Western Springs, Auckland. Hip hop artist Tha Feelstyle won three of the six contestable awards. The Lifetime Achievement Award was given to producer and community figure Phil Fuemana, who died two weeks before the ceremony.

Winners and nominees

2006 Pacific Music Awards 

The 2006 awards were held on Friday 12 May 2006 at the TelstraClear Pacific Events Centre in Manukau, Auckland. The awards were moved from March to May to coincide with New Zealand Music Month. No longer held as part of the Pasifika festival, the awards venue moved to the TelstraClear Pacific Events Centre in Manukau. The Phillip Fuemana Most Promising Artist Award was added, in honour of the late music producer.

2007 Pacific Music Awards 

The 2007 awards were held on Thursday 31 May 2007 at the TelstraClear Pacific Events Centre in Manukau, Auckland. Boy band Spacifix won three of the six contestable awards.

2008 S3 Pacific Music Awards 

From 2008 to 2010, the awards were known as the S3 Pacific Music Awards, with the Pacific road safety organisation S3 the naming-rights sponsor for three years. The 2008 awards were held on Thursday 29 May 2008 at the TelstraClear Pacific Events Centre in Manukau. A new People's Choice category was added to the awards, with the public voting on the shortlist of all finalists on the PMA website.

2009 S3 Pacific Music Awards 

The 2009 S3 Pacific Music Awards were held on Saturday 23 May 2009 at the TelstraClear Pacific Events Centre in Manukau, Auckland. Pop group Nesian Mystik won the most awards, with four wins. An award for Best Pacific Gospel Album was added to the honours.

2010 S3 Pacific Music Awards 

The 2010 S3 Pacific Music Awards were held on Saturday 29 May 2010 at the TelstraClear Pacific Events Centre in Auckland. South Auckland group Three Houses Down took out two prizes. The People's Choice Award was not given in 2010 due to "an
irregularity in the voting which compromised the results." A new prize was introduced for the most Radio Airplay.

2011 Polynesian Blue Pacific Music Awards 

In 2011 the awards were known as the Polynesian Blue Pacific Music Awards after airline Polynesian Blue became the naming rights sponsor. The awards were held on 28 May 2011 at the TelstraClear Pacific Events Centre. A new award for Best Pacific Language was introduced.

2012 Pacific Music Awards 

The 2012 awards were held on 31 May 2012 at the TelstraClear Pacific Events Centre in Auckland. Auckland R&B duo Adeaze won three awards. The 2012 awards did not have a naming-rights sponsor. The Radio Airplay Award category was dropped from the awards.

2013 Pasefika Proud Pacific Music Awards 

The 2013 awards were held on 30 May 2013 at the TelstraClear Pacific Events Centre in Auckland. From 2013 the awards are known as the Pasefika Proud Pacific Music Awards, with the government-run Family & Community Services community support programme Pasefika Proud the new naming-rights sponsor. The Best Pacific Gospel Album was dropped from the 2013 awards, the Radio Airplay Award category was added back, and new category Best Pacific Music Video was added. The theme for the year's awards is "honouring Pacific women". The awards were dominated by Aaradhna, who won six awards.

Winners are listed first and highlighted in boldface.

2014 Vodafone Pacific Music Awards 

The 2014 awards were held on Thursday 8 May 2014 at the Vodafone Events Centre (the new name of the TelstraClear Pacific Events Centre) in Auckland. The awards were known as the Vodafone Pacific Music Awards, with Vodafone New Zealand as the new naming-rights sponsor. The Radio Airplay award was again dropped from the 2014 awards, and the new category Best International Pacific Artist was added. The event celebrated the 10th anniversary of the awards.

Winners are listed first and highlighted in boldface.

2015 Vodafone Pacific Music Awards 

The 2015 awards were held on Saturday 13 June at the Vodafone Events Centre. Auckland duo Cydel won three awards and rap trio Smashproof won two awards. The Radio Airplay Award was brought back and a Special Recognition Award was presented to popera trio Sol3 Mio.

Winners are listed first and highlighted in boldface.

2016 Vodafone Pacific Music Awards 

The 2016 awards were held on Thursday 9 June at the Vodafone Events Centre. The theme for 2016 was "Don't forget your history, nor your destiny". R&B singer Vince Harder won three awards, and Pacific performance group Te Vaka won two. The Best Pacific Gospel Artist category was awarded for the first time since 2012, and new category Best Producer was added to the awards.

Winners are listed first and highlighted in boldface.

2017 awards 
Best Pacific Group - Three Houses Down

Best Pacific Male Artist - KINGS

Best Pacific Female Artist - Aaradhna

Best Pacific Urban Artist - KINGS

Best Pacific Song - 'Brown Girl' by Aaradhna

Best Pacific Language Song - 'Tulou Tagaloa' by Olivia Foa'i

Best Pacific Gospel Artist - Annie Grace

Best Pacific Music Video - 'Welcome to the Jungle' - Aaradhna.  Directed by Sophie Findlay

Best International Pacifc Artist - J Boog

Best Producer - KINGS

NZ on Air Radio Airplay Award - KINGS

Lifetime Achievement Award - Brother Love

Phil Fuemana Award for Most Promising Artist - Tommy Nee

People's Choice Best Pacific Artist Award - Three Houses Down ft General Fiyah

Special Recognition Award - Outstanding Achievement - Opetaia Foa'i

2018 awards 
Best Pacific Female Artist Award: Ladi6 ‘Royal Blue 3000 EP’

NZ Music Commission Best Pacific Male Artist Award: Noah Slee ‘Otherland’

Pacific Media Network Best Pacific Urban Artist Award: Noah Slee ‘Otherland’

Pacific Media Network Best Pacific Group Award: Tomorrow People ‘Lock Me Up’

NZ On Air Best Pacific Music Video Award: Samson Rambo ‘Here To Stay’

APRA Best Pacific Song Award: General Fiyah ‘Here To Stay’

SunPix Best Pacific Language: Tomorrow People ‘Sa’ili Le Alofa’

Auckland Council Best Pacific Gospel Artist Award: EFKS Te Atatu Junior Youth - ‘Fa’afetai Le Atua’

Flava Best International Pacific Artist Award: Tenelle ‘For The Lovers’

Recorded Music NZ Best Pacific Music Album Award: Ladi6 ‘Royal Blue 3000 EP’

SIT/MAINZ Best Producer Award: Parks, Brandan Haru & Julien Dyne ‘Royal Blue 3000 EP’

Vodafone People’s Choice Award: General Fiyah

NZ On Air Radio Airplay Award: Brooke Fraser ‘Therapy’

NZ On Air Streaming Award: Kings ‘We’ll Never Know’

Philip Fuemana Most Promising Pacific Artist: Poetik

Special Recognition Award For Outstanding Achievement: Otara Music & Arts Centre (OMAC)

Manukau Institute of Technology Lifetime Achievement Award: Punialava’a

2019 awards 
Auckland Council Best Pacific Female Artist Award: Razé - ‘Not About You’

NZ Music Commission Best Pacific Male Artist Award: Kings - Lov3 & 3go

PMN Best Pacific Group Award: Tomorrow People - BBQ Reggae

PMN Best Pacific Gospel Artist Award: Adeaze - A Mother's Love

Base FM NZ & Island Base FM Samoa Best Pacific Hip Hop Artist Award: SWIDT - The Most Electrifying

Best Pacific Soul/RnB Artist Award: Razé - ‘Not About You’

Pato Entertainment Best Pacific Roots/Reggae Artist: Tomorrow People - BBQ Reggae

Flava Best International Pacific Artist Award: Jaro Local - Dakini Tangarareh

SIT/MAINZ Best Producer Award: Kings & 10A  - Lov3 & 3go

NZ On Air Best Pacific Music Video: Villette ‘Money’ - Directed by Parker Howell, Baron VR

APRA Best Pacific Song: Kings - ‘6 Figures’ Written by Kingdon Chapple-Wilson

SunPix Best Pacific Language: Punialava’a Yesterday, Today & Tomorrow O ananafi, O nei ma Taeao

Recorded Music NZ Best Pacific Music Album Award: Tomorrow People - BBQ Reggae

Phillip Fuemana Award – Most Promising Pacific Artist: Melodownz

NZ On Air Radio Airplay Award: WINNER: General Fiyah feat Three Houses Down – ‘Here To Stay’

NZ On Air Streaming Award: Kings – ‘Don’t Worry About It’

SunPix People’s Choice Award – Best Pacific Artist: Tomorrow People

Manukau Institute of Technology Lifetime Achievement Award: Her Majesty Queen Sālote Tupou lll

2020 awards 
Best Pacific Female Artist: Olivia Foa’i – ‘Candid’

Best Pacific Male Artist: Poetik – ‘Hamofied 2’ EP

Best Pacific Group: Church & AP – ‘Teeth’

Best Pacific Music Video: Disciple Pati – The Boy Who Cried Woman

Best Pacific Song: Lani Alo – Alo I Ou Faiva (written by Metitilani Alo & Livingstone Efu)

Best Pacific Language: Olivia Foa’i – ‘Candid’

Best Pacific Hip Hop Artist: Church & AP – ‘Teeth’

Best Pacific Soul/R&B Artist: Jordan Gavet – ‘Hesitation’

Best Pacific Roots/Reggae Artist: Tomorrow People – Fever feat. Fiji

Best Pacific Gospel Artist: Lani Alo – Alo I Ou Faiva

Best International Pacific Artist: Josh Tatofi

Best Pacific Music Album: Olivia Foa’I – ‘Candid’

Best Producer: Dera Meelan (Church & AP – ‘Teeth’)

Phillip Fuemana Award – Most Promising Pacific Artist: Victor J Sefo

Radio Airplay Award: Church & AP – Ready or Not

Streaming Award: Kings – 6 Figures

People’s Choice Award – Best Pacific Artist: HP Boyz

Special Recognition Award: Jawsh685

Lifetime Achievement Award: Daniel Rae Costello

2021 awards 
2021 Pacific Music Awards finalists and winners in bold.

AUCKLAND COUNCIL BEST PACIFIC FEMALE ARTIST 

 Jordan Gavet – Do Better
 Lou’ana – ‘Moonlight Madness’
 Tree – ‘Mrs Tree’

NZ MUSIC COMMISSION BEST PACIFIC MALE ARTIST 

 Hawkins – Can’t Leave It Alone/Streetlights/Fireflies/I Couldn’t Tell It All
 Kings – Help Me Out
 Melodownz – Fine

FLAVA BEST PACIFIC GROUP 

 Church & AP – ‘At Thy Feet’
 Shepherds Reign – Aiga
 STNDRD – ‘Keep it STNDRD’
 Team Dynamite – Dragon Fruit ft. Louis Baker

NZ ON AIR BEST PACIFIC MUSIC VIDEO 

 Kings – Help Me Out – directed by Kings
 Tree – Afio Ane Loa – directed by Tree Manu & Quincy Filiga
 Vallé – Trip Advisor – directed by Jadon Calvert

APRA BEST PACIFIC SONG 

 Jawsh 685 – Savage Love (Laxed -Siren Beat) – written by Joshua Nanai, Phil Greiss, Jason Derulo, Jacob Kasher Hindlin
 Kings – Help Me Out – written by Kingdon Chapple-Wilson, Matt Sadgrove, Sam Eriwata, Joel Latimer
 Team Dynamite – Dragon Fruit ft Louis Baker – written by Tony Sihamau, Lance Fepuleai, Harry Huavi, Louis Baker

SUNPIX BEST PACIFIC LANGUAGE 

 Loopy Tunes Preschool Music – Umukisia
 Samson Squad – Taviri/Manea/Te Kuki Airani
 Shepherds Reign – Aiga
 Tree – ‘Mrs Tree’

BASE FM NZ & ISLAND BASE FM SAMOA BEST PACIFIC HIP HOP ARTIST 

 Church & AP – ‘At Thy Feet’
 Diggy Dupé – ‘That’s Me, That’s Team’
 Melodownz – Fine

BEST PACIFIC SOUL/R&B ARTIST 

 Emily Muli – Self Care
 Lepani – ‘In the Moment’
 Lou’ana – ‘Moonlight Madness’

BEST PACIFIC ROOTS/REGGAE ARTIST 

 Lomez Brown – ‘The Feels & Groove’
 Raggadat Cris – Nay Sayers
 Victor J Sefo – My Everything/Is It Bad/Want To/Like

531PI BEST PACIFIC GOSPEL ARTIST 

 Erakah – How You Love Me
 Marley Sola – Lift Your Head High
 TY – Never Too Far/Drive

NIU FM BEST INTERNATIONAL PACIFIC ARTIST 

 DJ Noiz – Amelia ft Kennyon Brown, Donell Lewis, Victor J Sefo
 J Boog – Siva Mai feat Siaosi
 Mr Cowboy – Daddy Toe Sau
 Tenelle – ‘This Is X’

RECORDED MUSIC NZ BEST PACIFIC MUSIC ALBUM 

 Lepani – ‘In the Moment’
 Lou’ana – ‘Moonlight Madness’
 Tree – ‘Mrs Tree’

BEST PRODUCER 

 Jawsh 685 – Savage Love (Laxed -Siren Beat) – producer: Jawsh 685
 Lepani – ‘In the Moment’ – producers: Lepani, Rory Noble, Ambian & Sleo, Devin Abrams
 Lou’ana – ‘Moonlight Madness’ – producer Nathan Judd

References

External links 
Pacific Music awards website
Vodafone New Zealand sponsorship

Music Awards, New Zealand
New Zealand music awards